425 South Financial Place (formerly known as FOUR40 prior to 2017, and as One Financial Place prior) is a 515 ft (157 m) tall skyscraper in Chicago, Illinois. It was completed in 1985 and has 40 floors. Skidmore, Owings & Merrill designed the building. It ranks 78th on the list of tallest buildings in Chicago.

In 2018, owner CIM Group completed renovations to the building.

425 South Financial Place houses the Chicago Stock Exchange. There is a boutique hotel on the top floor. 425 South Financial Place was the home of  Michelin-starred restaurant Everest before it closed in 2020. LaSalle Street Station is attached to the building.

References

External links

Skyscraperpage

Skyscraper office buildings in Chicago
Office buildings completed in 1985
Skidmore, Owings & Merrill buildings
1985 establishments in Illinois